"Story" is a song written and recorded by Japanese-American singer-songwriter Ai. It was released on May 18, 2005, by Island Records and Universal Sigma. The song served as the second single from Ai's fourth studio album, Mic-a-holic Ai.

Produced by 2Soul, "Story" became one of the biggest singles of the 2000s in Japan, peaking at number 8 on the Japanese Oricon singles chart, and was the sixth single in history to receive a triple million digital certification by the Recording Industry Association of Japan (RIAJ).

Background and release 
Ai previously released "365", the lead single for her then-upcoming fourth studio album. The song was used for a commercial tie-up in 2005.

"Story" was announced and released in May 2005.

Composition and lyrics 
"Story" is a R&B ballad song. Lyrically, the song is about relationships with a significant other.

Commercial performance 
Upon its release, "Story" became a sleeper hit, charting for 20 weeks in the top 30 in 2005 and 2006, however went on to sell over three million ringtones, one million cellphone downloads, and 270,000 physical copies. The single charted for 72 weeks total on the Oricon singles chart. In 2009, the song debuted at number 24 on the Billboard Japan Hot 100 with the reborn version included on Ai's greatest hits album, Best Ai. It later peaked at number 7 in its third week on the chart.

Live performances 
Since the release of "Story" in 2005, Ai has performed the song multiple times live. Ai performed "Story" at the 56th NHK Kōhaku Uta Gassen music competition on December 31, 2005, her first appearance on the program. In 2008, she performed the song at the El Rey Theatre, which marked her debut live performance in the United States. In 2009, she performed the song at the 3rd Asia Pacific Screen Awards.

Charts

Weekly charts

Year-end charts

Certifications

Cover versions 
"Story" has been covered by many Japanese artists on albums and live performances. Most notable covers are Makato Ozone's, Ms. Ooja's and May J.'s.

Track listing

Story (English Version) 

On October 21, 2014, it was revealed that an unreleased English version of "Story" would be used in Disney's 2014 animated film, Big Hero 6 for the Japanese dub. The song was released digitally as a single from the film's soundtrack on October 22, 2014 by EMI Records and Walt Disney Music in Japan. Regarding the song being included in the movie, Ai commented, "I was very happy to have sung 'Story' instead of a new song. Even if we sometimes feel uneasy or lonely, people always connect with someone." The song was used in the closing credits for the Japanese release. For the single cover photo, Ai is pictured with her sister, Sachi Uemura.

Track listing 
Digital download and streaming

 "Story (English Version)"  — 4:50

Music video 
A music video was released on January 27, 2015. Throughout the video, photos of loved ones submitted by fans are shown in the video.

See also 

 List of best-selling singles in Japan

References 

2005 singles
2014 singles
2005 songs
2014 songs
2000s ballads
2010s ballads
Universal Music Japan singles
Island Records singles
EMI Records singles
Walt Disney Records singles
Universal Music Group singles
Avex Group singles
Japanese-language songs
Ai (singer) songs
Songs written by Ai (singer)
Universal Sigma singles